Witherby is a surname, and may refer to:

 Harry Forbes Witherby (1873–1943), British publisher and ornithologist
 Russ Witherby (born 1962), American figure skater
 Thomas Witherby (1719–1797), of London, founder of Witherbys, one of the UK's oldest publishers now known as the Witherby Publishing Group